Ari Naftali Melber (born March 31, 1980) is an American attorney and journalist who is the chief legal correspondent for MSNBC and host of The Beat with Ari Melber.

The show premiered on July 24, 2017, and became the "longest-running" show at "MSNBC's 6 p.m. hour in network history" in 2021, beating "CNN in total viewers" and performing better against Fox News "than any other show before it."

In January 2021, The Beat was No. 1 at 6pm in ratings, averaging 2.6 million viewers a night and topping CNN and Fox News. In 2022, The Beat doubled CNN's ratings. According to Forbes, The Beats ratings are "MSNBC's best rating ever for the time slot". In December 2022, The Beat had higher ratings than every show on MSNBC and CNN, making AdWeek's list of "most watched cable news" shows, while trailing Fox News. The show has been on the air over 5 years.

The Beat was nominated for a 2020 Emmy Award for Outstanding Live Interview.

Melber's show has become one of the most viewed shows online and the most of any MSNBC show, per the Daily Beast,  and reached a billion streams, a "notable feat for a cable news program" (Reliable Sources).

The Beat drew 21 million monthly YouTube viewers in 2022, and is the "most streamed MSNBC show on YouTube." Beat reports are also some of the most watched MSNBC segments online.

Columbia Journalism Review dubbed Melber "a remarkably effective interviewer." New York Times columnist Peter Wehner called him "an outstanding interviewer, among the best on television".

Early life and education
Melber is Jewish, the son of an Israeli immigrant. His grandparents were Holocaust survivors.

Melber attended Garfield High School, Seattle, Washington, and the University of Michigan where he graduated with an AB degree in political science. After college, he moved to Washington, D.C. and worked for Senator Maria Cantwell. He then joined Senator John Kerry's presidential campaign, working the Iowa caucus and as California deputy political director. When Kerry lost, Melber went on to earn a J.D. degree from Cornell Law School, and was an editor of the Cornell Journal of Law and Public Policy.  He interned at New York County Defender Services, a public defender's office.

Melber worked for First Amendment lawyer Floyd Abrams at Cahill Gordon & Reindel from 2009 to 2013. He also began writing for news outlets like The Nation, The Atlantic, Reuters, and Politico. MSNBC took note and asked him to serve as a guest host. In April 2015, Melber was named their chief legal correspondent.

Media career

2015–2018 
Melber is a legal analyst for NBC News as well as MSNBC's chief legal correspondent, covering the United States Department of Justice, Federal Bureau of Investigation (FBI) and the Supreme Court.

He has won an Emmy Award for his Supreme Court coverage.

Melber reported that the firing of FBI Director James Comey could trigger an investigation into obstruction of justice on May 9, 2017 - the day Comey was fired - quoting a former FBI official who told him the firing raised potential obstruction. A probe was announced on May 18, 2017, which included an obstruction investigation.

Melber reported President Trump's actions toward Ukraine provided a potential case of impeachment for "bribery" in October. The next month, top Democrats began making the bribery case for the first time, showing "Democrats agreed with the MSNBC host," according to Mediaite. Republican Congressman Ratcliffe also cited a bribery segment from The Beat during an impeachment hearing.

A few months into the Mueller probe, on August 29, 2017, Melber broke the story that a state investigator was exploring jurisdiction to charge potential defendants in the Mueller probe with state crimes, meaning a conviction would not be eligible for a presidential pardon. Politico followed up on the report the next day, and New York State prosecutors ultimately did file separate charges against Paul Manafort in March 2019.

2019 
Melber interviewed former Trump campaign manager Corey Lewandowski in February 2019 about whether Trump asked him to interfere in the Mueller probe, and Melber later reported that Lewandowski's response was false. In a 2019 congressional hearing, Lewandowski was questioned about that false answer.

Melber broke the story of police repeatedly tasing a Virginia man until he died in police custody, an investigative report that led to an FBI investigation of the officers' conduct.

On the night of the 2018 midterm elections, Melber broke a story that Democrats on the Ways and Means Committee "intend to request President Trump's tax returns." In April 2019, United States House Committee on Ways and Means Chairman Richard Neal carried out that plan.

The Beat with Ari Melber has featured newsworthy interviews, such as Sheriff Joe Arpaio, who talked to Melber after receiving the first pardon of Trump's administration; Eric Holder, Kamala Harris, Trump attorney Jay Sekulow, Dave Chappelle, Meek Mill, Ken Starr, and a range of witnesses in the Mueller probe, including Steve Bannon, whose The Beat interview was his first ever appearance on MSNBC.

Melber has drawn attention for his interviewing skills. He was nominated for an Emmy Award for "Outstanding Live Interview" for interviewing four key witnesses in the Mueller probe at once. In November 2019, Columbia Journalism Review stated Melber is "a remarkably effective interviewer", adding "his veins appear to contain ice water; he betrays no emotion at all" during intense exchanges.

The New York Times columnist Peter Wehner, a former White House official in GOP administrations, said in February 2019, "Melber is an outstanding interviewer, among the best on television." Director Lee Daniels got emotional in a 2019 interview about his life and career with Melber, saying it was the only time he would ever "cry on television".

2020 
In June 2020, conservative commentator Tiana Lowe wrote "Ari Melber on MSNBC" runs a "good straight news hour," contrasting The Beat to other news programs. Mediaite wrote The Beat is a "thought-provoking" and "idiosyncratic show" that "avoids the singular focus on Trump's misdeeds that consumes some other hosts", adding Melber's interviewing style uses "the facts of the story and logical reasoning [not] partisan cheap shots" for "fascinating" exchanges.

January 6 reporting 
Melber conducted several newsworthy interviews with former Trump aide Peter Navarro, and one of the interviews was cited as evidence by Congress to hold Navarro in contempt, which led to his DOJ indictment.

Melber wrote a foreword to the HarperCollins edition of the January 6 Report, which became a #1 New York Times bestseller.

Music and Culture 
Melber regularly uses hip hop lyrics to explain political or legal scenarios. A Vanity Fair article about MSNBC dubbed him the "secret fourth Beastie Boy", writing he is "shockingly smart and well read."

Apple Music launched a music show hosted by Melber, Nevuary Radio, in 2019.

In 2022, Melber did a special report on the song "God Did" by Jay-Z and DJ Khaled, with "acutely detailed dissection" of his verse, and Jay Z then released audio of Melber's report as a new Jay-Z track, "Hov Did," on streaming music platforms. Meek Mill references The Beat in his music video "Mandela Freestyle."

Melber previously served as the host of The Point; a cohost of MSNBC's show The Cycle; and a substitute host for The Rachel Maddow Show. Melber was a correspondent for The Nation; and he has been published in The Atlantic, Reuters and Politico and several books; he wrote a report about Organizing for America.

Personal life
Melber attended Garfield High School in Seattle, WA. Melber lives in Carroll Gardens, Brooklyn. He is divorced from Drew Grant since 2017, a pop culture reporter at The New York Observer. He is a member of the New York State Bar Association.

References

External links

 
 
 Huffington Post
 
  (MSNBC News; July 29, 2022)

1980 births
Living people
21st-century American journalists
21st-century American male writers
21st-century American non-fiction writers
American male non-fiction writers
American political commentators
American political writers
Cornell Law School alumni
Garfield High School (Seattle) alumni
MSNBC people
NBC News people
New York (state) lawyers
People from Carroll Gardens, Brooklyn
University of Michigan College of Literature, Science, and the Arts alumni
20th-century American Jews
American people of Israeli descent
21st-century American Jews